David Robert Bartosch (March 24, 1917 – April 30, 2006) was an American corner outfielder in Major League Baseball who played for the St. Louis Cardinals in their 1945 season. Listed at 6' 1", 190 lb., Bartosch batted and threw right-handed. He was born in St. Louis, Missouri.

Bartosch played minor league baseball from 1936 to 1940 and in 1945 and served in the United States Coast Guard during World War II.

He hit for an average of .255 (12-for-47) in 24 games for the Cardinals, including a double, one RBI, 12 hits and nine runs scored.  He scouted for the Cardinals and San Diego Padres after his playing career ended.

Bartosch died in 2006 in Nashville, Tennessee, at the age of 89.

Sources
Baseball Reference (MLB)
Baseball Reference (MiLB)

1917 births
2006 deaths
United States Coast Guard personnel of World War II
Asheville Tourists players
Columbus Red Birds players
Daytona Beach Islanders players
El Dorado Lions players
Major League Baseball infielders
Major League Baseball outfielders
Paducah Indians players
Pine Bluff Judges players
Portsmouth Red Birds players
San Diego Padres scouts
St. Louis Cardinals players
St. Louis Cardinals scouts
Union City Greyhounds players
Union Springs Springers players
United States Coast Guard enlisted
Baseball players from St. Louis